Francisco Rosa Rivera (19 March 1972 – 16 February 2010) was a Puerto Rican bodybuilder.

Early years
Francisco Rosa Rivera (not to be confused with Francisco Rivera Rosa, the Puerto Rican painter) was born in Ponce, Puerto Rico, on 19 March 1972. Rosa Rivera studied acting ("Actuación Dramática") and received a B.S. degree in Business Administration from the Interamerican University of Puerto Rico. He was a practicing martial arts guru, having achieved a Black Belt in Karate and a First Dan in Tae-Kwon-Do. In 1994, he became a certified personal trainer by the National Strength and Conditioning Association (NSCA).

Career
He was called the "Trainer of Stars" because people like Ricky Martin, Osvaldo Ríos, Melwin Cedeño, Xavier Torres and Angelique Burgos Vidal («La Burbu») trained with him.  After receiving his Personal Trainer certification, he established his own personal training gymnasium in Guaynabo, Puerto Rico. During 1998-2000, he also hosted his own TV show named "A fuego, meridiano". He also headed the program Tu mañana, in Univisión Puerto Rico (Channel 11), where he carried two segments, "Francisco en acción" (Mondays) and "Francisco al extremo" (Fridays).

Family life
He was married to Paola Díaz. They had three children: Mya Paola (b. 2005); Francisco Andrés (b. 2007) and Lya Melisha (b. April 2009). And Adriana Nicole (b. 1998) from a previous marriage to Enid González.

Later years
During his later years, Rosa Rivera developed a unique bodybuilding program known as FRANCO (from its abbreviation in Spanish "Fuerza, Resistencia, Agilidad, Nutrición, Compromiso y Organización"; English: Strength, Resistance, Agility, Nutrition, Commitment, and Organization). He also campaigned to include supervised physical exercise in the medical programs for senior citizens and obese children and marketed the sporting fashion line that has its name.

Death
Rosa Rivera died in Caguas on 16 February 2010 a victim of tongue and throat cancer. He had been diagnosed in September 2008.

References

Notes

See also

List of Puerto Ricans

1972 births
2010 deaths
Interamerican University of Puerto Rico alumni
Puerto Rican bodybuilders
Sportspeople from Ponce, Puerto Rico